There are many listed buildings in Penarth, a seaside town in the Vale of Glamorgan, Wales. Penarth was popular with holidaymakers from far afield, but also a popular place to live for the wealthy business owners of Penarth and nearby Cardiff. The town has a wealth of Victorian and Edwardian architecture.

A listed building is one considered to be of special architectural, historical or cultural significance, and has restrictions on amendments or demolition. Buildings are listed as either Grade I, II* and II buildings lists, with the Grade I being the most important.

Key

Grade I and II* listed buildings

Grade II listed buildings
According to the British Listed Buildings website there are 44 buildings in Penarth listed as Grade II, in addition to a bridge, a cenotaph, a pillar box and five telephone boxes. These include:

See also
 Listed buildings in the Vale of Glamorgan
 Grade I listed buildings in the Vale of Glamorgan
 Grade II* listed buildings in the Vale of Glamorgan

References

Sources
 Penarth, Vale of Glamorgan, BritishListedBuildings.co.uk
 Royal Commission on the Ancient and Historical Monuments of Wales (RCAHMW) website listings

Penarth
Penarth